The 1998–99 Northern Premier League season was the 31st in the history of the Northern Premier League, a football competition in England. Teams were divided into two divisions; the Premier and the First. It was known as the Unibond League for sponsorship reasons.

Premier Division 

The Premier Division featured four new teams:

 Gateshead relegated from the Football Conference
 Stalybridge Celtic relegated from the Football Conference
 Whitby Town promoted as champions of Division One
 Worksop Town promoted as runners-up of Division One

League table

Results

Division One 

Division One featured four new teams:

 Alfreton Town relegated from the NPL Premier Division
 Burscough promoted as runners-up from the NWCFL Division One
 Hucknall Town promoted as champions from the NCEFL Premier Division
 Radcliffe Borough relegated from the NPL Premier Division

League table

Results

Promotion and relegation 

In the thirty-first season of the Northern Premier League Altrincham (as champions) were automatically promoted to the Football Conference. Chorley and Accrington Stanley were relegated to the First Division; these two clubs were replaced by relegated Conference sides Barrow and Leek Town, First Division winners Droylsden and second placed Hucknall Town. In the First Division Great Harwood Town and Alfreton Town left the League at the end of the season and were replaced by newly admitted Ossett Town and Workington.

Cup results

Challenge Cup 
Featuring teams from both leagues.

{{8TeamBracket-NoSeeds
| RD1=Quarterfinals
| RD2=Semifinals
| RD3=Final
| RD1-team5= Blyth Spartans
| RD1-score5=4
| RD1-team6= Droylsden
| RD1-score6=3
| RD1-team1= Hucknall Town
| RD1-score1=0
| RD1-team2= Farsley Celtic| RD1-score2=0
| RD1-team7= Guiseley| RD1-score7=12
| RD1-team8= Accrington Stanley
| RD1-score8=11
| RD1-team3= Stalybridge Celtic| RD1-score3=5
| RD1-team4= Burscough
| RD1-score4=2
| RD2-team3= Blyth Spartans
| RD2-score3=0
| RD2-team4= Guiseley| RD2-score4=2
| RD2-team1= Hucknall Town
| RD2-score1=11
| RD2-team2= Stalybridge Celtic| RD2-score2=12
| RD3-team1= Stalybridge Celtic'| RD3-score1= 2
| RD3-team2= Guiseley
| RD3-score2= 1
}}

President's Cup
'Plate' competition for losing teams in the NPL Cup.Droylsden 2–1 Leigh Railway Mechanics Institute

Peter Swales Shield
Between Champions of NPL Premier Division and Winners of the NPL Cup.Altrincham'' bt. Stalybridge Celtic

References

External links 
 Northern Premier League Tables at RSSSF

1998-99
6